The Pioneer Column was a force raised by Cecil Rhodes and his British South Africa Company in 1890 and used in his efforts to annex the territory of Mashonaland, later part of Zimbabwe (once Southern Rhodesia).

Background
Rhodes was anxious to secure Matabeleland and Mashonaland before the Germans, Portuguese or Boers did. His first step was to persuade the Matabele King Lobengula, in 1888, to sign a treaty giving him rights to mining and administration (but not settlement as such) in the area of Mashonaland which was ruled by the King by use of coercion and murderous raids involved tribute-taking and abduction of young men and women. Using this Rudd Concession (so called because Rhodes's business partner, Charles Rudd, was instrumental in securing the signature) between Rhodes' British South Africa Company (allegedly on behalf of Queen Victoria though without any official knowledge or authority) and Lobengula, he then sought and obtained a charter from the British government allowing him to act, essentially although in a limited way, with the government's consent. The next step was to occupy the territory.

Column assembly 

Rhodes's military advisers estimated that it would take 2,500 men and about one million pounds to win the war that would, they thought, inevitably result when Lobengula realised that Rhodes meant not only to mine but also to occupy his land. Frank Johnson, a 23-year-old adventurer, however, undertook to deliver the territory in nine months with a mere 250 men for £87,500. Frederick Selous, a hunter with close knowledge of Mashonaland, agreed to join the effort as guide. Johnson published recruitment notices in Kimberley offering each volunteer  of land and 15 mining claims (aggregating about ). On the advice of Rhodes, Johnson selected for his column, from thousands of applicants, mostly the sons of rich families, so that if they were, indeed, imperiled by Lobengula their families would be more likely to enlist British government support for their rescue. Johnson's column eventually consisted of 180 civilian colonists, 62 wagons and 200 volunteers (who ultimately formed the nucleus of what became the British South Africa Police). A further party of 110 men, 16 wagons, 250 cattle and 130 spare horses later attached itself to the column. The troopers were equipped with Martini-Henry rifles, revolvers, seven-pound field guns and Maxim machine guns, as well as an electric searchlight (which they later used to good effect to intimidate Matabele warriors shadowing the column).

Occupation 

The route began at Macloutsie in Bechuanaland on 28 June 1890. On 11 July, it crossed the river Tuli into Matabeleland. It proceeded north-east and then north over a distance of about  intending to terminate at an open area explored by Selous a few years earlier that he called Mount Hampden. However, the column halted about  before that at a naturally flat and marshy meadow bounded by a steep rocky hill; (today's Harare Kopje) on 12 September (later celebrated as a Rhodesian public holiday). The British union flag was hoisted on the following day, 13 September in Fort Salisbury

Three towns were founded; the first in early August at the head of a gentle route that led up from the low altitude area known as the Lowveld (named Providential Pass), called Fort Victoria (renamed Masvingo in 1982); the second at Fort Charter on a plateau halfway to the terminus of the column at the originally named Fort Salisbury.

The Pioneer Corps was officially disbanded on 1 October 1890 and each member was granted land on which to farm.

Consequences 
The effects of the Pioneer Column were immense. Mashonaland and Matabeleland ceased to be the poorly developed backwaters they had slipped into since the decline of the Mwenemutapa state began about 400 years earlier with the arrival of the Portuguese. The Shona and Matabele were forcibly compelled to join the modern world of the West. This was accomplished through a hut tax aimed at forcing African men to leave their herds and their barter economy to join the cash economy of the West via wage labour. A new elite snatched control from the Iron Age monarchy which had formerly held sway and retained power through demonstration of overwhelming technological superiority along with a towering confidence in its achievements. A new moral order was also imposed that has dramatically altered the culture and beliefs of the indigenous people and stopped their population decline.

Campaign medal 
In 1927, the government of Southern Rhodesia issued a new British South Africa Company Medal to commemorate the earlier 1890 Pioneer Column. This medal was identical to the prior British South Africa Company Medals issued for the First Matabele War and Second Matabele War, except that it was struck without any campaign details on the reverse.

See also 
 Nehanda Nyakasikana
 Shangani Patrol

References 

 
 
 

1890 establishments in Southern Rhodesia
1890 establishments in the British Empire
1890s in Southern Rhodesia
History of Rhodesia
Members of the Pioneer Column
Military history of the British South Africa Company
Military units and formations established in 1890